The Nobel Prize in Physics is awarded annually by the Royal Swedish Academy of Sciences to scientists who have made outstanding contributions in Physics. It is one of the five Nobel Prizes which were established by the will of Alfred Nobel in 1895.

Every year, the Royal Swedish Academy of Sciences sends out forms, which amount to a personal and exclusive invitation, to about three thousand selected individuals to invite them to submit nominations. The names of the nominees are never publicly announced, and neither are they told that they have been considered for the Prize. Nomination records are strictly sealed for fifty years. , the nominations for the years 1901 to 1970 are publicly available. Despite the annual sending of invitations, the prize was not awarded in six years (1916, 1931, 1934, 1940–1942) and have been delayed for a year nine times (1914, 1917, 1918, 1921, 1924, 1925, 1928, 1932, 1943).

From 1901 to 1970, 574 scientists were nominated for the prize, 92 of which were awarded either jointly or individually. 31 more scientists from these nominees were awarded after 1970 and John Bardeen was awarded a second time on 1972. Of the 10 women nominees, only two were awarded the prize. The first woman to be nominated was Marie Curie in 1902 by German scientist Emil Warburg and French mathematician Gaston Darboux, and she won the prize the next year. She is the only woman to win a Nobel Prize twice: Physics (1903) and Chemistry (1911). Besides 22 and 3 scientists from these nominees won the prizes in Chemistry (including two more women) and in Physiology or Medicine correspondingly (including years after 1970). Only one informal corporation and one organization have been nominated: the Nuclear scientists (1946 and 1947) and CERN (1970).

Despite the long list of nominated noteworthy physicists, astronomers, engineers, and chemists, there have been other famed scientists who were overlooked for the prize in physics, such as physicists G.Fr.FitzGerald, G.Stokes, J.W.Gibbs, P.Drude, H.Minkowski, W.Ritz, G.J.Stoney, Osb.Reynolds, Fr.C.Alw.Pockels, V.Schumann, N.Umov, Ernst Pringsheim Sr., M.Smoluchowski, W.Voigt, M.Abraham, Al.Friedmann, G.Wulff, Ant. van den Broek, F.Kurlbaum, G.Sagnac, Em.Wiechert, R.Pictet, P.Ehrenfest, P.Knipping, L.Shubnikov, M.P.Bronstein, Ett.Majorana, Edw.Hall, S.P.Schubin, D.S.Roschdestwenski, Ol.Lodge, J.Larmor, J.Ishiwara, N.Dm.Papaleksi, R.Ch.Tolman, A.H.Pfund, W. W. Hansen, H.Nagaoka, Y.Nishina, Ya.Frenkel, Th.Kaluza, J.Lennard-Jones, H.Weyl, Al.Proca, J. von Neumann, G.Mie, D.Hartree, Ad.Smekal, P. Pringsheim, H. von Halban, Fr.Houtermans, B.Podolsky, A.I.Alikhanov and Ern.Marsden; astronomers and astrophysicists: H.A.Rowland, Ot.W.v.Struve and his grandson Otto Struve, P.J.C.Janssen, Ch.Aug.Young, S.Newcomb, G.V.Schiaparelli, K.Schwarzschild, P.Lowell, J.N.Lockyer, W.de Sitter, brothers Edw.Ch. and W.H.Pickering, R.H.Fowler, G.W.Ritchey, J.Jeans, Gr.Shajn, Otto Schmidt, G.Adr.Tikhov, C.K.Seyfert and Dm.Dm.Maksutov; inventors and engineers: Al.St.Popov, B.Rosing, G.B.Pegram, Ig.Kurchatov and S.Korolev.

Nominees by their first nomination

1901–1909

1910–1919

1920–1930

1931–1939

1940–1949

1950–1959

1960–1969

1970–

See also 

 List of Nobel laureates in Physics
 List of female nominees for the Nobel Prize
 List of nominees for the Nobel Prize in Chemistry
 List of nominees for the Nobel Prize in Literature
 List of individuals nominated for the Nobel Peace Prize
 List of organizations nominated for the Nobel Peace Prize

References 

+
Lists of physicists